Building Technology & Ideas (BTI, stylized building technology & ideas ltd.) is a real estate developer in Bangladesh. Its head office is located in Gulshan, Dhaka, and it has one other branch office in Chittagong.

History 

BTI started in Dhaka, Bangladesh in 1984 by developing residential apartments and condominiums and, in later years, began developing commercial properties. Initially founded as a partnership, it was bought out by its founding partner, Arshi Haider, in 1995.

Its startup head office was beside Sher-e-Bangla National Cricket Stadium in BRTC Building at Mirpur, Dhaka. In 1989, the company shifted its office to the TMC Building in Eskaton followed by the final shift to its own premise at Gulshan in Celebration Point.

From 2011 to 2016, Building technology and ideas ltd. added “Standard Collection". As of 2009, BTI was working on plans to develop international standard gated communities.

Over the years, bti has developed different collections catering to the different socio-economic sectors. The ranges are categorized under: The Platinum Collection, The Premium Collection, The Classic Collection, The Standard Collection and The Commercial Collection.

List of companies 
The companies of BTI are listed below
 bti brokerage
 bti interior solutions
 bti retail ltd
 bti holdings ltd.
 bti Contracting ltd.
 bti Building Products.
 Design & Construction Ltd.
 Stainless Industrial Corporation Ltd.

See also
 List of companies of Bangladesh

References

Conglomerate companies of Bangladesh
Real estate companies of Bangladesh
Bangladeshi companies established in 1984
Real estate companies established in 1984
Holding companies established in 1984